Geonemini is a weevil tribe in the subfamily Entiminae.

Taxonomy 
The tribe Geonemini was first named by Gistel in 1856 (p. 373).

Genera 
There are 40 genera currently placed in Geonemini:

 Anomadus Horn, 1876: 21: Mexico.
 Anomonychus Faust, 1893: 298: Algeria.
 Apotomoderes Dejean, 1834: 253: Dominican Republic, Haiti, Mona.
 Artipus Sahlberg, 1823: 22: Bahamas, Cuba, Hispaniola, Jamaica, Mona, Pinos I., Puerto Rico, Saint Barthelemy; SE United States (Florida); Oligocene (USA) (?).
 Barynotellus Voss, 1962: 283: Tanzania.
 Barynotus Germar, 1817: 341: Europe; E, W Canada (I), NE United States (I).
 Bradyrhynchoides Pierce, 1913: 412: Mexico; SW United States (Texas).
 Bufomicrus Sharp, 1891: 102 : Belize, Guatemala, Honduras, Nicaragua.
 Calyptillus Horn, 1876: 27: NC, SW United States.
 Claeoteges Pascoe, 1880: 427: Belize, Costa Rica, Guatemala, Honduras, Mexico, Nicaragua, Panama.
 Cleistolophus Sharp, 1891: 102 : Belize, Costa Rica, Guatemala, Honduras, Mexico, Nicaragua.
 Compsonomus Jekel, 1875: 138  = Eugeonemus Buchanan, 1947: 44: Cuba, Haiti.
 Cryptolepidus Van Dyke, 1936: 191: Mexico; NW, SW United States.
 Cychrotonus Pascoe, 1871: 162: Angola; Botswana, Tanzania, Zaire.
 Decasticha Champion, 1911b: 273: Costa Rica, Panama.
 Doleropus Buchanan, 1947: 46: Cuba.
 Epicaerus Schönherr, 1834: 323: Belize, Costa Rica, El Salvador, Guatemala, Honduras, Mexico, Panama; NC, NE, NW, SE, SW United States; Oligocene (USA).
 Eumestorus Sharp, 1891: 102: Belize, Mexico.
 Geonemus Schönherr, 1833: 13: S France, Spain, Balearic Is., Algeria, Morocco.
 Graphorhinus Say, 1831: 8: NC, SW United States.
 Heteroschoinus Schönherr, 1847: 42: S Africa.
 Ischionoplus Chevrolat, 1878: IX: Cuba, Dominican Republic.
 Kosmimodes Setliff, 2019: 851: Dominican Republic.
 Lachnopus Schönherr, 1840: 380: Anguilla, Cuba, Guadeloupe, Hispaniola, Jamaica, Mona, Nevis, Puerto Rico, St. Barthélemy, St. Croix, Sint Eustatius, Saint Kitts, St. Thomas, Saint Vincent, Tortola; SE United States; Miocene (USA).
 Lyperobates Broun, 1893: 1461: New Zealand.
 Maseorhynchus Sharp, 1891: 102: Belize, Guatemala, Mexico.
 Mazenes Champion, 1911: 280: Guatemala, Mexico.
 Melathra Franz, 2011: 353: Dominican Republic.
 Naupactopsis Champion, 1911: 278: Mexico.
 Omileus Horn, 1876: 102: Mexico; SW United States; Miocene (USA).
 Plenaschopsis Blaisdell, 1925: 341: Mexico.
 Prosayleus Schönherr, 1840: 840: Australia.
 Pseudomelactus Heller, 1916: 312: New Caledonia.
 Pycnophilus Sharp, 1891: 166: Costa Rica.
 Scelianoma Franz & Girón, 2009: 220: Puerto Rico.
 Sciorhinus Sharp, 1891: 102: Mexico.
 Stamoderes Casey, 1888: 236: W Canada, NW, SW United States.
 Stereogaster Van Dyke, 1936b: 84: SW United States.
 Tenillus Scudder, 1893: 35: (+) Oligocene (USA)
 Trigonoscuta Motschulsky, 1853: 79: Mexico; W Canada, NW, SW United States; Miocene (USA).

References

External links 

Entiminae